is a Japanese manga artist. He has worked on titles such as Flag Fighters, Ironcat, Hagane, and Xenon. He is best known worldwide for his work on the Street Fighter II manga in the early 1990s.

References

Living people
Manga artists
Year of birth missing (living people)